Mukul Goel is an Indian civil servant. He is the current Director General civil defence at Indian state Uttar Pradesh from May 2022 and had previously served as the Additional Director General (ADG) of Border Security Force. He was suspended by the erstwhile Mayawati's government in 2007 for alleged irregularities in police recruitment. He is 1987 batch IPS officer of Uttar Pradesh cadre. On 11 May 2022 Uttar Pradesh Chief Minister Yogi Adityanath removed Director General of Police Mukul Goel from his post for inefficiency and neglecting his work. At present he is working as DGP (Civil Defence) at UP Police.

Early life 
He was born on 22 February 1964 in Shamli (earlier part of Muzaffarnagar district), Uttar Pradesh, India. He holds a Bachelor of Technology degree in Electrical engineering from IIT Delhi.

Career 
Mukul Goel served Uttar Pradesh Police in various capacities such as police chief of districts like Gorakhpur, Varanasi, Mainpuri, Azamgarh, Saharanpur and Meerut. He also served as Deputy inspector general of police (DIG) in Kanpur, Agra and Bareilly ranges. In 2013, he served as the Additional director general of police (Law and Order) after riots broke out in Muzaffarnagar and its neighboring districts. Later, he served as ADG of Criminal Investigation Department and ADG (Indian Railways). In 2016, Goel was appointed as the IG of Border Security Force and moved to New Delhi on deputation. In June 2021, the Yogi Adityanath-led Government of Uttar Pradesh appointed him as the Director General of Police of the state.

Honours and decorations 
  Police Medal for Gallantry, 2003
  Police Medal for Meritorious service, 2003
  President's Police Medal for Distinguished service, 2012

Controversies 
In 2000, he was suspended after the murder of BJP politician and legislator Nirbhay Pal Sharma during his tenure in Saharanpur as SSP. It was also alleged that Nirbhay Pal Sharma had called the police but the police did not respond on time.

In September 2007, Mukul Goel, along with other 24 IPS officers were suspended  by then UP Chief minister Mayawati after various FIRs were lodged against them for alleged irregularities in the recruitment of Uttar Pradesh Provincial Armed Constabulary (PAC), Police and Radio wireless personnel. Later, they were reinstated when all the cases were withdrawn by then Akhilesh Yadav-led government in 2012 when Samajwadi Party (SP) came in power.

References 

Director Generals of Uttar Pradesh Police
Indian Police Service officers
IIT Delhi alumni
Living people
1964 births